An election for the leadership of the Liberal Party of Australia took place on 20 December 1972, following former Prime Minister William McMahon's resignation after his defeat at the 1972 federal election. Billy Snedden was successful in winning the leadership, narrowly beating Nigel Bowen by 30 votes to 29 on the fifth ballot. The previous ballot was tied at 29 each, with one MP not voting. James Killen, John Gorton, and Malcolm Fraser had earlier been eliminated from contention, in that order.

Background

Candidates
 Nigel Bowen, former Minister for Foreign Affairs, Member for Parramatta
 Malcolm Fraser, former Minister for Education and Science, Member for Wannon
 John Gorton, former Leader and Prime Minister, Member for Higgins
 James Killen, former Minister for the Navy, Member for Moreton
 Billy Snedden, incumbent Deputy Leader and former Treasurer, Member for Bruce

Results

The following table gives the ballot result:

Leadership ballot

Deputy leadership ballot

Other candidates in order of elimination:

 Malcolm Fraser
 Jim Forbes
 Don Chipp
 James Killen

Aftermath

References

Liberal Party of Australia leadership spills
December 1972 events in Australia
1972 elections in Australia
Liberal Party of Australia leadership election